Petroscirtes mitratus, the floral blenny, floral fangblenny, helmeted blenny, or the crested sabretooth blenny, is a species of combtooth blenny found in coral reefs in the Pacific and Indian ocean.  This species reaches a length of  TL. It is the type species of the genus Petroscirtes.

References

External links
 

mitratus
Fish described in 1830